The 2009–10 season was the 115th in the history of Arsenal Football Club. It began on 1 July 2009 and concluded on 30 June 2010, with competitive matches played between August and May. The club ended the Premier League campaign in third position, 11 points behind champions Chelsea. In the domestic cup competitions, Arsenal were knocked out in the fourth round of the FA Cup to Stoke City and the fifth round of the League Cup against Manchester City. They failed to progress past the quarter-finals of the UEFA Champions League, losing to reigning champions Barcelona in a two-legged tie.

Arsenal did little business in the transfer market; their only outfield signing of the summer was defender Thomas Vermaelen from Ajax. Several players however left the club before the campaign got under way, including Emmanuel Adebayor and Kolo Touré in separate deals to Manchester City. To reinvigorate the side and benefit from Cesc Fàbregas's creativity, manager Arsène Wenger instituted a fluid 4–3–3 formation. The team made an impressive start; by November they had scored 36 goals in 11 league games and qualified for the Champions League knockout stage with a game to spare. Arsenal's defensive fragility was a recurring theme throughout the season and meant the team struggled to sustain a title challenge; they suffered back-to-back Premier League losses on four occasions.

41 different players represented Arsenal in four competitions and there were 14 different goalscorers. Arsenal's top goalscorer was Fàbregas, who scored 19 goals in 36 appearances.

Players

Squad information

* - Sol Campbell made 197 appearances and scored 11 goals during his time at Arsenal between 2001 and 2006.

Transfers 
Arsenal made one outfield signing during the summer, defender Thomas Vermaelen from Ajax in a deal estimated at £10 million. Several players were let go, including Amaury Bischoff who joined in 2008 and played the majority of his football in the reserves and Rui Fonte. Striker Emmanuel Adebayor was sold to Manchester City for a fee of £25 million and Kolo Touré soon joined him, ending a seven-year association with Arsenal. His former teammate Sol Campbell rejoined the club during the winter transfer window, having been a free agent. Wenger, who signed him to bolster the squad's defensive options, said: "He has a fantastic attitude and good fitness. Of course he is not the youngest but he is in a very good shape. He can still play in the Premier League. He is important in the dressing room as well. He's positive with the young players."

A number of players were loaned out during the season for game time and career development. Goalkeeper Wojciech Szczęsny joined Brentford in November 2009 and stayed their for the remainder of the season, while in the January window Jack Wilshere and Philippe Senderos moved to Bolton Wanderers and Everton respectively.

In

Out

Loan out

Club

Coaching staff

Kit 
Supplier: Nike / Sponsor: Fly Emirates

Kit information 
Nike released two new kit for Arsenal this season.

 Home: The home kit from last season was unchanged.
 Away: The away kit including a pinstripe in the kit and a polo collar inspired by the shirts worn by the all-conquering side of the 1930s. Along with the midnight blue shirt, the kit features midnight blue shorts with a photo blue stripe and midnight blue socks with a photo blue stripe on the top band.
 Third: The third kit include a panel of horizontal stripes at the back of the shirt, to mirror the craftsmanship of a fine English shirt. The third shorts are anthracite grey with a redcurrant stripe along the side. The socks are white with vertical redcurrant pinstripes and an anthracite stripe on the top band.
 Keeper: The home goalkeeper kit are jade blue. The sleeves are a darker shade of jade blue than the body. The shirt will be worn with jade blue shorts and socks. The away goalkeeper kit are yellow. The sleeves are a darker shade of yellow than the body. The shirt will be worn with black shorts and yellow socks and The third goalkeeper kit are grey. The sleeves are a darker shade of grey than the body. The shirt will be worn with grey shorts and socks

Other information

Pre-season

Premier League 

A total of 20 teams competed in the Premier League in the 2009–10 season. Each team played 38 matches; two against every other team and one match at each club's stadium. Three points were awarded for each win, one point per draw, and none for defeats. At the end of the season the top three teams qualified for the group stages of the UEFA Champions League; the team in fourth needed to play a qualifier.

The provisional fixture list was released on 17 June 2009, but was subject to change in the event of clashes with other competitions, inclement weather, or matches being selected for television coverage.

August–October 

The league campaign began for Arsenal with a trip to Goodison Park to face Everton on 15 August 2009. Denílson scored the opening goal four minutes before the half-hour and Vermaelen doubled Arsenal's lead, heading the ball in from a Robin van Persie cross. Everton's failure to mark Gallas brought about the visitors' third just before the break. Fàbregas scored two goals in the second half and substitute Eduardo added Arsenal's sixth, before Saha scored for Everton in stoppage time. The game marked Vermaelen's league debut and the player was described by The Guardians match correspondent Andy Hunter as "comfortably the finest defender on display," having limited his counterpart Marouane Fellaini to so few chances while "anticipating danger expertly". The following week Abou Diaby scored two goals as Arsenal beat Portsmouth 4–1. Arsenal then travelled to play the incumbent champions Manchester United at Old Trafford. Arshavin's goal in the 40th minute gave Arsenal the lead, but Manuel Almunia conceded a penalty in the second half, as he adjusted to have fouled striker Wayne Rooney in the penalty box. Rooney converted the spot kick to level the scoreline, before Diaby headed the ball into his own net from a United free-kick. Late on, Wenger was sent to the stands for kicking a water bottle after Van Persie's equaliser was correctly disallowed. He felt the defeat was an "undeserved" one, going further to criticise his opponents' tactics: "I have seen a player make 20 fouls without getting a yellow card. If you have seen the game, you don't need me to tell you who but their player gets away without a yellow card. It's quite amazing."

Arsenal did not play another game for a fortnight because of the international football break. On the resumption of club football, they faced Manchester City. At the City of Manchester Stadium, Arsenal lost for the second league match in succession, this time by a two-goal margin. Adebayor scored against his former club and caused controversy by running towards the Arsenal section and celebrating in front of them. Television replays also caught the striker attempting to stamp Van Persie's face. At home, Arsenal responded with a 4–0 win against Wigan Athletic and a single Van Persie's goal was enough to beat Fulham away in the team's final match of September.  Vito Mannone's performance at Craven Cottage was praised; he stood in for the injured Almunia. After six games, Arsenal garnered 12 points and stood in fifth position, having played a game less than each of the teams occupying the top four.

The visit of Blackburn Rovers to the Emirates Stadium in early October coincided with the start of Wenger's 13th year at the club. Six different players (Vermaelen, Van Persie, Arshavin, Fàbregas, Theo Walcott and Nicklas Bendtner) scored in the team's 6–2 win. Arsenal defeated Birmingham City 3–1 at home before conceding twice away to West Ham United on 25 October 2009 to draw. Arsenal's final game of October was a North London derby against Tottenham Hotspur. Van Persie scored the opening goal in the 42nd minute, before Fàbregas added a second immediately – he won the ball straight from the kick-off and went past Tottenham's static defence, before shooting past Heurelho Gomes. Van Persie scored Arsenal's third in the second half and the 3–0 win moved Arsenal into third position, five points behind Chelsea in first who played a game more.

 November–January 

Arsenal's first fixture of November was against Wolverhampton Wanderers at the Molineux Stadium. The team moved into second place as a result of a 4–1 win. Wenger was sceptical of whether his team could reach a century of goals in the league, but was overjoyed at Arsenal's goal tally of 36 in 11 league matches: "[It] shows that the way we play football, the way we are organised and the way we go forward suits our players." Following the international football break, Arsenal played Sunderland at the Stadium of Light. Eduardo deputised for Van Persie, who injured himself whilst playing for the Netherlands. Darren Bent's goal in the 71st minute won the match for Sunderland, who became the first team to prevent Arsenal from scoring in a league match. Manchester United's defeat of Everton moved Arsenal down into third position in the league table, three points ahead. At home to league leaders Chelsea on 29 November 2009, Arsenal lost 3–0; striker Didier Drogba scored two goals in either interval of the game. When asked if Arsenal's title chances were over, Wenger replied, "It is not over and I believe, on what I have seen of Chelsea, that the team can drop points."

December saw Arsenal win five out of six league matches. Arshavin and Aaron Ramsey each scored against Stoke City at home, and the team came from behind to beat Liverpool at Anfield – a ground where they were winless in five years. The victory was attributed to Wenger's half-time team talk where he uncharacteristically shouted at his players and told them they were "not fit to wear the shirt" after a poor first-half performance. "Of course it can always go the other way and you can lose 6–1. Then it's a crisis; it is like that." he told reporters. Arsenal were then held to a 1–1 draw at Burnley which meant they remained in third spot, with the gap between themselves and Chelsea ever increasing. The team returned to winning ways at home to Hull City as Denílson, Eduardo and Diaby got on the scoresheet in a 3–0 victory. A day after Boxing Day, Arsenal beat Aston Villa by the same scoreline; Fàbregas came off the substitutes' bench and scored twice. The Arsenal captain however injured himself in the closing stages of the match and was ruled out for their next game, away to Portsmouth. Nevertheless, the team recorded a 4–1 victory to move four points behind leaders Chelsea with a game in hand.

Tomáš Rosický scored in stoppage time to deny Everton their first win at Arsenal in 14 years. The match, which saw the visitors lead twice, was played in cold conditions as a result of the "Big Freeze". Arsenal then faced Bolton Wanderers back-to-back; the home fixture was originally called off on 6 January 2010 due to heavy snow. At the Reebok Stadium, goals from Fàbregas and Fran Mérida saw the visitors to victory in what was Owen Coyle's first game in charge of Bolton. In the reverse fixture three days later Arsenal won again to go back in first spot, this time coming back from two goals down to win 4–2. Their stay at the top of the table was brief and moved back down to third, after they were held to a goalless stalemate against Aston Villa in the midweek round, while Chelsea beat Birmingham. Arsenal's best chances in the match came in the first half; Fàbregas and Rosicky both had efforts hit the post and crossbar respectively.

The end of January brought the visit of Manchester United to the Emirates Stadium. Wenger described the game as an opportunity for Arsenal to prove they were "mentally prepared" to compete in the title race, but his team were outclassed by the visitors which prompted boos from the home support at the final whistle. Nani opened the scoring just after the half-hour mark and was involved in the counter-attack that led to the second goal four minutes later, finished off by Rooney. Park Ji-sung added a third for United in the second half, before Vermaelen scored late on to make the scoreline 3–1. The defeat left Arsenal still in third with 14 games remaining, five points behind leaders Chelsea.

 February–May 
Arsenal's poor form against the title challengers continued: at Stamford Bridge they were unable to get the better of a Chelsea side that powered into a 2–0 lead in the first half-hour. Drogba opened the scoring in the eighth minute when John Terry headed the ball across the face of goal and he tapped in at the far post. The striker scored his second of the game from a counter-attack. In his match report for The Guardian, Kevin McCarra opined that Arsenal were "strangled by stereotype" and a second successive defeat put end to their title bid. Wenger downplayed the defeat, and told reporters "we didn't get a demonstration of football but they were efficient;” his comments on possession irked Chelsea midfielder Michael Ballack. Arsenal returned to winning ways in midweek with a narrow victory against Liverpool and then scored twice to beat Sunderland. At the Britannia Stadium, Arsenal forged a comeback against Stoke City but their win was overshadowed by the injury to Ramsey. The midfielder broke his right leg following a challenge by Stoke defender Ryan Shawcross, who was immediately sent off. Wenger described the tackle as "horrendous" and added "People say we don’t fancy the physical side of it, but this is the result. If you see a player getting injured like that, it’s not acceptable."

A win against Burnley in March put Arsenal level on points with second-place Chelsea having played a game more. The team needed a late goal against Hull City, courtesy of Bendtner in the third minute of stoppage time to get three points and move above Manchester United into second place. Wenger was defiant his team could win the title after Arsenal beat West Ham to move top; it was their sixth consecutive league win and victory was ensured when Fàbregas converted a penalty late on. They were without Vermaelen for the trip to St Andrew's as the defender was sent off against West Ham. Arsenal were unable to hold on to their lead against Birmingham as Almunia's error gifted a stoppage-time equaliser, scored by Kevin Phillips. With six games remaining, Arsenal stood in third place, three points behind Chelsea and four on leaders Manchester United.

At home against Wolverhampton Wanderers, Bendtner scored the winning goal in stoppage time, rising highest inside the six-yard box and heading in Sagna's cross. In the North London derby, Tottenham beat Arsenal at White Hart Lane to record their first league win against Wenger's side since November 1999. Danny Rose on his debut opened the scoring with a 30-yard volley and Gareth Bale doubled the host's lead minutes into the second half. Bendtner scored with five minutes remaining of normal time but the game ended 2–1 to Tottenham, leaving Arsenal six points adrift of Chelsea at the top.

Wenger was so incensed by Arsenal's response against Wigan – conceding three in the final 10 minutes to throw away a 2–0 lead – that he ordered the team bus to drop his players at Wigan railway station and told them to make their way back home. With Arsenal's title bid over, the team played out a goalless draw against Manchester City and then lost to Blackburn Rovers in early May.  Arsenal secured third place on the final day, beating Fulham at home by four goals.

 Matches 

 Classification 

 Results summary 

 Results by round 

 FA Cup 

Arsenal entered the FA Cup in the third round (last 64), in which they were drawn to face fellow Premier League club West Ham United away from home. They came from a goal down to beat their London rivals and progress, but made an exit the following round against Stoke where an understrength side were undone in the final 20 minutes. Wenger defended his team selection, pointing out to the media: "We had 10 injuries and a very difficult programme coming up."

 Football League Cup 

Arsenal entered the Football League Cup in the third round, where they were drawn at home against West Bromwich Albion. Helped by the dismissal of Jerome Thomas, Arsenal's young team – averaging at 20 years – were able to beat the visitors by two goals to progress. A strong performance against Liverpool followed in the competition, but Arsenal were knocked out in the quarter-final stage when Manchester City defeated them by three goals.

 UEFA Champions League 

Given Arsenal finished fourth in the league the previous season, the club played a qualifying round against Celtic to ensure progression into the group stages. In the first leg at Celtic Park, Arsenal broke the deadlock when Fábregas' free-kick deflected in off defender William Gallas and past the goal net. Gary Caldwell's own goal deep into the second half strengthened Arsenal's advantage on a night when their midfielder Alex Song was described by journalist David Hytner as being "…outstanding, his strength, smart positioning and interceptions helping to stem Celtic raids and launch those of his own team."

Arsenal beat Celtic 3–1 in the return leg a week later; it was not without controversy as the Celtic players accused Eduardo of diving to win his team a penalty that led to the first goal. UEFA charged the striker and banned him for two matches as he was found guilty of deceiving referee Manuel Gonzalez. Arsenal lodged an appeal and the ban was overturned at a later date.

 Play-off round 

 Group stage 

Arsenal were drawn in Group H, along with Greek club Olympiacos, Belgian side Standard Liège and Dutch champions AZ Alkmaar. The team mounted a comeback against Standard Liège on the first night of the competition, having conceded twice in the space of the first five minutes. Eduardo's deciding goal, which came nine minutes before the end marked the fifth season in the previous six that Arsenal opened their campaign with a win. Late goals from Van Persie and Arshavin secured a 2–0 win at home to Olympiacos, but the team were unable to make it three wins after conceding a stoppage-time goal to draw 1–1 against AZ. In the reverse match, staged on matchday four, Fábregas scored twice in Arsenal's 4–1 win which put the club on 10 points in the group. Victory against Standard Liège ensured qualification into the knockout stages with a match to spare. That game was against Olympiacos, which Wenger made changes to his first XI. Arsenal lost 1–0 at the Karaiskakis Stadium.

 Knockout phase 

 Round of 16 
Arsenal faced Porto in the knockout stages. In the first leg at the Estádio do Dragão, an own goal by goalkeeper Łukasz Fabiański gave Porto the lead, but Campbell scored Arsenal a crucial away goal seven minutes later when he headed in a corner. Radamel Falcao restored Porto's lead in the second half and the tie finished 2–1 in their favour. At the Emirates Stadium, Arsenal overturned Porto's slender advantage as Bendtner scored twice inside the first 25 minutes. Nasri and Emmanuel Eboué added further goals before Bendtner converted a penalty to round off a hat-trick.

 Quarter-finals 
In the quarter-finals, Arsenal played Barcelona which marked the return of former club captain Thierry Henry. Barcelona dominated proceedings but did not find a way through the Arsenal defence until the early stages of the second half; Zlatan Ibrahimovic took advantage of Almunia leaving his box and rushing towards him by lofting the ball over the goalkeeper. Ibrahimovic doubled Barcelona's lead, to which Wenger responded by bringing Walcott on. The forward made an instant impact with his pace and acceleration, scoring past Victor Valdes. Barcelona defender Carles Puyol was sent off for a second bookable offence when he fouled Fábregas in the box, and the Arsenal captain converted the penalty awarded by the referee to equalise.

Walcott, who Barcelona manager Pep Guardiola described as Arsenal's biggest threat, was named in the first XI for the return leg and set Bendtner up to score. The joy was short lived as Messi equalised within minutes and he added a further three goals to give Barcelona a 6–3 aggregate win – 4–1 on the night. Wenger was full of praise for Messi afterwards, telling reporters: "…We lost against a team that is better than us and that has the best player in the world. Once he's on the run, Messi is unstoppable. He's the only player who can change direction at such a pace."

 Squad statistics 
Arsenal used a total of 41 players during the 2009–10 season and there were 20 different goalscorers. There were also four squad members who did not make a first-team appearance in the campaign. This was the first season the team played in a 4–3–3 formation, utilised for the benefit of Fàbregas. Sagna featured in 44 matches – the most of any Arsenal player in the campaign. Vermaelen started in 33 league matches.

The team scored a total of 115 goals in all competitions. The highest scorer was Fàbregas, with 19 goals, 15 of which scored in the league. Vermaelen was the only Arsenal player to be sent off in the entire season. The side's continuing sportsmanship was acknowledged at the end of the season with the Barclays Fair Play Award.

KeyNo. = Squad numberPos = Playing positionNat. = NationalityApps = AppearancesGK = GoalkeeperDF = DefenderMF = MidfielderFW''' = Forward

 = Yellow cards

 = Red cardsNumbers in parentheses denote appearances as substitute. Players with number struck through and marked  left the club during the playing season.''

Source:

See also 

 2009–10 in English football
 List of Arsenal F.C. seasons

References 

2009-10
2009–10 Premier League by team